Past Masters is an Oxford University Press book series published from 1980. The series aims to provide a brief introduction to the ideas and beliefs of important thinkers from the past. A number of the books were subsequently republished in the Oxford Very Short Introductions series which began to replace the Past Masters series from around 1995.

Publication history
Note: This list may not be complete. ISBNs given refer mainly to the paperback editions.

1980s
Aquinas, A. J. P. Kenny, 1980. 
Burke, C. B. Macpherson, 1980. 
Dante, George Holmes, 1980. 
Francis Bacon, Anthony Quinton, 1980. 
Galileo, Stillman Drake, 1980. *
Homer, Jasper Griffin, 1980. 
Hume, A. J. Ayer, 1980. 
Jesus, Humphrey Carpenter, 1980. 
Marx, Peter Singer, 1980.
Pascal, A. J. Krailsheimer, 1980. 
Confucius, Raymond Dawson, 1981. 
Engels, Terrell Carver, 1981.*
Machiavelli, Quentin Skinner, 1981.  *
Montaigne, Peter Burke, 1981. 
Aristotle, Jonathan Barnes, 1982.
Berkeley, J. O. Urmson, 1982. 
Carlyle, A. L. Le Quesne, 1982. 
Darwin, Jonathan Howard, 1982. 
Kant, Roger Scruton, 1982. *
Tolstoy, Henry Gifford, 1982. 
Bayle, Elisabeth Labrousse, 1983. 
Clausewitz, Michael Howard, 1983.*
Cobbett, Raymond Williams, 1983. 
Diderot, Peter France, 1983. 
George Eliot, Rosemary Ashton, 1983. 
Hegel, Peter Singer, 1983.*
Muhammad, Michael Cook, 1983. 
Plato, R. M. Hare, 1983. 
Proust, Derwent May, 1983. 
The Buddha, Michael Carrithers, 1983.*
Thomas More, Anthony Kenny, 1983. 
William Morris, Peter Stansky, 1983. 
Chaucer, George Kane, 1984. 
Goethe, T. J. Reed, 1984. 
Lamarck, L. J. Jordanova, 1984. 
Leibniz, George MacDonald Ross, 1984. 
Locke, John Dunn, 1984. *
Petrarch, Nicholas Mann, 1984. 
Adam Smith, D. D. Raphael, 1985. 
Bergson, Leszek Kołakowski, 1985. 
Cervantes, P. E. Russell, 1985. 
Gibbon, J. W. Burrow, 1985. 
Mill, William Thomas, 1985. 
Ruskin, George P. Landow, 1985. 
Vico, Peter Burke, 1985. 
Augustine Henry Chadwick, 1986. *
Shakespeare, Germaine Greer, 1986. *
Spinoza, Roger Scruton, 1986.*
Virgil, Jasper Griffin, 1986. 
Descartes, Tom Sorell, 1987. 
Malthus, Donald Winch, 1987. *
Montesquieu, Judith N. Shklar, 1987. 
Kierkegaard, Patrick Gardiner, 1988.*
Wittgenstein, A. C. Grayling, 1988.*
Arnold, Stefan Collini, 1989. 
Bentham, J. R. Dinwiddy, 1989. 
Hobbes, Richard Tuck, 1989.*
Freud, Anthony Storr, 1989.*

1990s
Paine, Mark Philp, 1989. 
Disraeli, John Vincent, 1990.  
Erasmus, James McConica, 1991. 
Paul, E. P. Sanders, 1991. *
Schiller, T. J. Reed, 1991. 
Durkheim, Frank Parkin, 1992. 
Samuel Johnson, Pat Rogers, 1993. 
Jung, Anthony Stevens, 1994.*
Nietzsche, Michael Tanner, 1994.  *
Schopenhauer, Christopher Janaway, 1994.*
Tocqueville, Larry Siedentop, 1994. 
Rousseau, Robert Wokler, 1995.*
Keynes, Robert Skidelsky, 1996. 
Russell, A. C. Grayling, 1996.*
Gandhi, B. C. Parekh, 1997. *
Heidegger, Michael Inwood, 1997. *
Past Masters: German Philosophers: Kant, Hegel, Schopenhauer & Nietzsche, Roger Scruton et al., 1997. 
Three Great Economists: Smith, Malthus, Keynes, Keith Thomas et al., 1997. 
Frege, Joan Weiner, 1999. 

 *Also published as a Very Short Introduction.

References

Series of non-fiction books
Oxford University Press books